Spilomela perspicata is a moth in the family Crambidae. It is found in French Guiana, Suriname, Peru, Venezuela and Costa Rica.

References

Moths described in 1787
Spilomelinae